The Gods River is a remote wilderness river in the Hudson Bay drainage basin in Northern Manitoba, Canada. Its flows from its source at Gods Lake to its mouth at the Hayes River. The Hayes River flows to Hudson Bay.

The First Nations communities of Gods River (Manto Sipi Cree Nation) and Shamattawa are located at the river's source and at the confluence with the Echoing River respectively.

Tributaries
Yakaw River (left)
Echoing River (right)
Red Sucker River (right)
Stull River
White Goose River

See also
List of rivers of Manitoba

References

Rivers of Northern Manitoba
Tributaries of Hudson Bay